Kalyan is one of the ten basic thaats of Hindustani music from the Indian subcontinent. It is also the name of a raga (more popularly known as Yaman) within this thaat.

Description
Kalyan thaat consists of an important group of evening ragas. Characterised by the teevra Madhyam, this thaat literally means good luck. Ragas of this thaat are considered to be a blessing-seeking and soothing. As a result, they are performed in the evening at the beginning of a concert. These ragas create a feeling of the unfolding of an evening.

The Hindustani Classical Thaats are defined in their relation with the Bilawal Thaat, which has all shuddha(pure) notes.

Ragas

Ragas in Kalyan Thaat: 
Yaman,
Bhupali,
Hindol, 
Kedar, 
Shuddha Kalyan, 
Shyam Kalyan,
Yaman Kalyan, 
Khem Kalyan,
Savani Kalyan
Chhayanat,
Hameer,
Gaud Sarang,
Kamod,
Maru Bihag,
Nand,

References

Hindustani music theory